Janet Gurwitch is the founder of Gurwitch Products, the manufacturer of Laura Mercier Cosmetics. She founded the company in 1995 and launched the Laura Mercier line in March 1996.

Biography

A native of Hattiesburg, Mississippi, United States, and graduate of the University of Alabama, Gurwitch began her career at Foley's department store in Houston, Texas, rising to the position of senior vice president of merchandising.  She then moved to Neiman Marcus and served as the executive vice president from 1992 to 1995. As EVP, she was responsible for the merchandising strategy for all 35 stores.  She founded Gurwitch Products in 1996 in order to market a boutique line of cosmetics carrying the name of French make-up artist Laura Mercier.  She sold Laura Mercier to Alticor in 2006.

Today, Gurwitch is an operating partner at Advent International, a Boston-based private equity firm, where she serves on the board of Olaplex.  (NASDAQ: OLPX)  She previously served on the boards of Drybar, Urban Decay, Tatcha, First Aid Beauty, La-Z-Boy and Dollar Shave Club,.

Gurwitch is also currently an investor and board member of the Houston Astros baseball team.

External links
Brief official biography

In the media
Interview on The BusinessMakers Show February 14, 2009.
Panelist at the Milken Institute Global Conference, Building a Brand April 2018

References
CNN/Money.com, “Yes, More Mascara: How to launch a good-looking cosmetics brand.”, July 1, 2004. Retrieved March 24, 2006.

Specific

1954 births
Living people
People from Hattiesburg, Mississippi
20th-century American businesspeople
20th-century American businesswomen
21st-century American women